The 2023 Arlington mayoral election will be held on May 6, 2023. It will elect the mayor of Arlington, Texas. The election will be officially nonpartisan. Incumbent Republican mayor Jim Ross is running for re-election to a second term in office.

Candidates

Declared 
 Amy Cearnal, real estate business owner and Arlington Tax Increment Reinvestment Zone board member
 Jim Ross, incumbent mayor (Party affiliation: Republican)

Results

References

External links
Official campaign websites
 Amy Cearnal for Mayor
 Jim Ross (R) for Mayor

Mayoral elections in Arlington, Texas
2023 Texas elections
Arlington, Texas